Club Deportivo Giner Torrero is a Spanish football team based in Zaragoza in the community of Aragon. Founded in 1967, it plays in 3ª – Group 17.

Season to season

5 season in Tercera División
51 seasons in Categorías Regionales

External links
Official Website  

Football clubs in Aragon
Sport in Zaragoza
Association football clubs established in 1967
Divisiones Regionales de Fútbol clubs
1967 establishments in Spain